The Premio del Piazzale is a Group 3 flat horse race in Italy open to thoroughbreds aged three years or older. It is run at Milan over a distance of 1,600 metres (about 1 mile), and it is scheduled to take place each year in October.

The event was formerly classed at Listed level, and it used to be held in September. For a period it was contested over 1,800 metres.

The race was given Group 3 status and switched to October in 2011.

Records
Most successful horse since 1997 (2 wins):
 Embody – 1998, 1999

Leading jockey:
 Cristiano Demuro - Nabucco (2013), Voice Of Love (2016)

Leading trainer (2 wins):
 Ralf Rhone - Estejo (2010), Nabucco (2013)
 Stefano Botti - Douce Vie (2012), Voice Of Love (2016)

Winners since 2002

 The 2021 races took place at Capannelle.

Earlier winners
 1956: Ribot
 1975: Carnauba
 1976: Strasburgo
 1977: Eran
 1985: Capo Nord
 1987: Jurado

 1988: Lord Americo
 1989: Lord Americo
 1990: Wild Grouse
 1991: Sure Sharp
 1992: Inner City
 1994: Visto Si Stampi

 1995: Thomire
 1997: Kierkegaard
 1998: Embody
 1999: Embody
 2000: Montestefano
 2001: As You Like

See also
 List of Italian flat horse races

References
 Racing Post / www.labronica.it:
 2004, 2005, 

 horseracingintfed.com – International Federation of Horseracing Authorities – Premio del Piazzale (2016).
 pedigreequery.com – Premio del Piazzale – Milan San Siro.

Horse races in Italy
Open mile category horse races
Sport in Milan